The Women's Super Smash, known for sponsorship reasons as the Dream11 Super Smash, is a women's Twenty20 cricket competition organised by New Zealand Cricket.

The competition began in 2007–08 and features six teams, who play each other twice in a double round-robin format. The winner of the group advances to the final, and the second and third placed teams play in an elimination final. The competition runs alongside the 50-over Hallyburton Johnstone Shield.

The current champions are Canterbury Magicians, who won the 2022–23 competition. Wellington Blaze are the most successful side in the history of the competition, with seven title wins.

History
The tournament began in 2007–08, as the State League Twenty20. Teams played each other once, with the winner of the group being crowned champions: Canterbury Magicians were the inaugural winners. The following season had a final, in which Wellington Blaze beat defending champions Canterbury.

The following season kept the same format, but was known as the New Zealand Cricket Women's Twenty20, with the Central Hinds winning their first title. For the following two seasons, the tournament was known as the Action Cricket Twenty20, before becoming simply the New Zealand Women's Twenty20 Competition until the 2017–18 season. In this period, Wellington and Canterbury won three titles apiece, and one each for Auckland Hearts and Otago Sparks.

In 2018–19, the tournament was renamed the Burger King Women's Super Smash, in line with the men's competition. In 2019–20, Dream11 became the sponsors, and an elimination final, a match between the second and third placed teams to advance to the final, was introduced. Wellington Blaze won three titles in a row between 2017–18 and 2019–20, but Canterbury beat them in the final in 2020–21. Wellington regained their title in 2021–22, going unbeaten in the group stage before beating Otago in the final. Canterbury won their sixth title in 2022–23, beating Wellington in the final after finishing third in the group stage.

Tournament names

Teams

Roll of Honour

See also

 Super Smash (men's cricket)
 Plunket Shield
 Hallyburton Johnstone Shield
 The Ford Trophy
 Cricket in New Zealand

Notes

References

External links
 

 
New Zealand domestic cricket competitions
Women's cricket competitions in New Zealand
Recurring sporting events established in 2007
Twenty20 cricket leagues